Brahman is a term in Hinduism for the metaphysical ultimate reality, the highest unchanging Universal Principle in the universe.

Brahman may also refer to:

 Brahman languages, a hypothetical Trans–New Guinea family of languages spoken in Madang Province in Papua New Guinea
 Brahman (band), a Japanese rock band
 Brahman (cattle) is a breed of cattle descended from the Bos indicus

See also
 Brahmin, a priestly varna/caste
 Brahmana, an important layer of Hindu canonical text that is part of each of the Vedas
Bramman, a 2014 Indian film directed by Socrates
 Para Brahman
 Brahm (disambiguation)
 Brahma (disambiguation)
 Brahmin (disambiguation)